Peucedanum ostruthium or Imperatoria ostruthium, masterwort, is a species of flowering plant in the family Apiaceae. It is native to the mountains of Central and Southern Europe, but has been widely introduced outside its native range.

Distribution
Masterwort is native to the mountains of Central and Southern Europe, including the Carpathians, Alps, northern Apennines, Massif Central and isolated occurrences in the Iberian Peninsula. It has, however, been widely introduced and cultivated and its native range is therefore not entirely clear.

Use
Masterwort is used as a flavouring for various liqueurs and bitters. Its roots and leaves have been used in the traditional Austrian medicine internally (as tea, liqueurs and wine) and externally (as fumigation, tincture or incense) for treatment of disorders of the gastrointestinal tract, skin, respiratory tract, cardiovascular system, infections, fever, flu and colds.

Chemical constituents
The plant is a source of coumarins, including oxypeucedanin, ostruthol, imperatorin, osthole, isoimperatorin and ostruthin.

References

External links

ostruthium
Edible Apiaceae
Flora of Europe
Medicinal plants
Plants described in 1753
Taxa named by Carl Linnaeus